Natalia Alejandra Piergentili Domenech (born 14 August 1978) is a Chilean politician who currently serves as president of the Party for Democracy.

References

External links
 

1978 births
Living people
Chilean people
21st-century Chilean politicians
Party for Democracy (Chile) politicians
University of Santiago, Chile alumni
Complutense University of Madrid alumni
Autonomous University of Barcelona alumni
University of Chile alumni